West Bear Creek is a small tributary to Bear Creek located in eastern North Carolina. The West Bear Creek watershed is a tiny contributing area of the Neuse River basin.

The geology of the area is mostly siliclastic sediments and organic soils. Deep groundwater is fed to the creek by the Black Creek aquifer. Land use in the area is mostly agriculture, although the Seymour Johnson Air Force Base, the city of Goldsboro, and the town of La Grange are located with 10 to 15 miles of the creek.

Because of the surrounding land use, West Bear Creek experiences large nitrate fluxes, resulting in poor water quality. The site has been the focus of numerous research investigations on the fate and transport of nitrogen in groundwater. Further work will shed light on more details of this creek's hydrology and the role agriculture plays in impaired water quality of streams.

References
Kennedy, C.D., L.C. Murdoch, D.P. Genereux, D.R. Corbett, K. Stone, P. Pham, and H. Mitasova (2010), Comparison of Darcian flux calculations and conventional seepage meter measurements in a sandy streambed in North Carolina, USA, Water Resources Research 46, W09501, doi:10.1029/2009WR008342.

Kennedy C.D., D.P. Genereux, D.R. Corbett, and H. Mitasova (2009), Relationships among groundwater age, denitrification, and the coupled groundwater and nitrogen fluxes through a streambed, Water Resources Research 45, W09402, doi:10.1029/2008WR007400.

Kennedy C.D., D.P. Genereux, D.R. Corbett, and H. Mitasova (2009), Spatial and temporal dynamics of coupled groundwater and nitrogen fluxes through a streambed in an agricultural watershed, Water Resources Research, 45, W09401, doi:10.1029/2008WR007397.

Genereux, D.P., S. Leahy, H. Mitasova, C.D. Kennedy, and D.R. Corbett (2008), Spatial and temporal variability of streambed hydraulic conductivity in West Bear Creek, North Carolina, USA, Journal of Hydrology, 358, 332-353, doi:10.1016/j.jhydrol.2008.06.017.

Rivers of North Carolina